Minbu Nikō (民部日向, 1253–1314) was a Buddhist disciple of Nichiren. He took over Kuon-ji after Nichiren's death, and can thus be considered one of the founders of Nichiren-shū. He was also put in charge of Mount Minobu after Nikkō left in 1288.

External links 
 The Six Major Disciples of Nichiren
._.

1253 births
1314 deaths
Japanese Buddhist clergy
Nichiren-shū Buddhist monks
Nichiren Buddhism
Kamakura period Buddhist clergy